Baltimore City Passenger Railway Power House and Car Barn, also known as the Charles Theatre, is a historic street railway building located at Baltimore, Maryland, United States. It is a two-story brick Romanesque Revival style building, constructed in 1892, that has been altered for a variety of uses over the years. The southern half of the building (now the Charles Theater) was used for the power house; the northern half (formerly the Famous Ballroom and a bowling alley) was used for the car barn. It was constructed by Baltimore's oldest streetcar company to provide cable traction on one of its first and most important lines. The car barn was the node where the Baltimore & Northern Railway transferred its streetcars to City Passenger tracks. In 1939 the United Railways and Electric Company sold the structure and it was then converted into a theater, bowling alley, and ballroom.

Baltimore City Passenger Railway Power House and Car Barn was listed on the National Register of Historic Places in 1998.

See also
Baltimore City Passenger Railway

References

External links
, including photo from 1998, at Maryland Historical Trust
The Charles Theater website

Buildings and structures in Baltimore
Transport infrastructure completed in 1892
Railway buildings and structures on the National Register of Historic Places in Baltimore